Puerto Rico will participate in the 2011 Parapan American Games.

Archery

Puerto Rico will send one male athlete to compete.

Table tennis

Puerto Rico will send two male table tennis players to compete.

Wheelchair tennis

Puerto Rico will send one male athlete to compete.

References

Nations at the 2011 Parapan American Games
2011 in Puerto Rican sports
Puerto Rico at the Pan American Games